The Old Sinclair Station, at 507 S. Texas in Bryan, Texas, was built in 1933.  It was listed on the National Register of Historic Places in 1987.

References

Gas stations on the National Register of Historic Places in Texas
National Register of Historic Places in Brazos County, Texas
Buildings and structures completed in 1933